Tiwa and Tigua may refer to:

 Tiwa Puebloans, an ethnic group of New Mexico, US
 Tiwa (Lalung), an ethnic group of north-eastern India
 Tiwa language (India), a Sino-Tibetan language of India
 Tiwa languages, a group of Tanoan languages of the US

People with the name 
 Malakai Tiwa (born 1986), Fijian footballer
 Monty Tiwa (born 1976), Indonesian film director and screenwriter 
 Tiwa Savage (born 1980), Nigerian singer

See also 
 Tewa
 Tigua Pueblo, also known as Ysleta del Sur Pueblo
 Tiguex (disambiguation)

Language and nationality disambiguation pages